Syaiful Indra Cahya (born 28 May 1992) is an Indonesian professional footballer who plays as a full-back for Liga 2 club Persipura Jayapura.

Club career 
On December 1, 2014, he signed with Persija Jakarta.

International career 
Syaiful called up to Indonesia under-21 team and played in 2012 Hassanal Bolkiah Trophy, but failed to win after losing 0-2 from Brunei under-21 team. He made his international debut for the Indonesia national team on 6 February 2013 in the 2015 AFC Asian Cup qualification against Iraq.

Career statistics

International

International goals 
Syaiful Indra Cahya: International under-23 goals

Honours

Club
Arema
 Indonesia President's Cup: 2017

International
Indonesia U-21
 Hassanal Bolkiah Trophy runner-up: 2012

References

External links
 
 Syaiful Cahya at Liga Indonesia

1992 births
Living people
Sportspeople from Malang
Indonesian footballers
Indonesia international footballers
Indonesian Premier League players
Persema Malang players
Persija Jakarta (IPL) players
Persik Kediri players
Persija Jakarta players
Arema F.C. players
Bali United F.C. players
Semen Padang F.C. players
Indonesia youth international footballers
Footballers at the 2014 Asian Games
Association football fullbacks
Asian Games competitors for Indonesia